Antônio Soares Dias (7 June 1945 – 29 November 2022) was a Brazilian lawyer and politician. A member of the National Renewal Alliance, he served in the Chamber of Deputies from 1983 to 1990.

Soares died in Belo Horizonte on 29 November 2022, at the age of 77.

References

1945 births
2022 deaths
Members of the Chamber of Deputies (Brazil)
Members of the Chamber of Deputies (Brazil) from Minas Gerais
Members of the Legislative Assembly of Minas Gerais
National Renewal Alliance politicians
Federal University of Minas Gerais alumni
20th-century Brazilian politicians
People from Montes Claros